Norman Brosterman (born 1952) is an American author, art dealer, and collector. He is an authority on the history of children's construction toys and building blocks, and antique pattern-making and mosaic toys. He has written Inventing Kindergarten (1997) on the history of the original kindergarten system and its influence on the development of abstract art and modern architecture in the 20th century. In 1989, his collection of antique construction toys was acquired by the Canadian Centre for Architecture in Montreal.

Selected exhibitions
 Potential Architecture: Construction Toys from the CCA Collection, Canadian Centre for Architecture, 4 December 1991 to 8 March 1992
 Inventing Kindergarten, Alyce de Roulet Williamson Gallery at ArtCenter College of Design, 14 October 2006 to 7 January 2007

Selected publications
 Potential Architecture: Construction Toys from the CCA Collection. / Architecture potentielle: jeux de construction de la collection du CCA. Montreal: Canadian Centre for Architecture, 1991. 
 Drawing the Future: Design Drawings for the 1939 New York World's Fair. New York: Museum of the City of New York, 1996. (contributor) 
 "Child's Play", Art in America, Vol. 85, No. 4 (1997).
 Inventing Kindergarten. New York: Abrams, 1997. 
 Out of Time: Designs for the Twentieth-Century Future. New York: Abrams, 2000.

References

External links 
http://www.brosterman.com/
Norman Brosterman talking about Inventing Kindergarten: Seedbed of Modern Art.

Living people
American non-fiction writers
Art writers
Historians of childhood
1952 births